Islamic views on adoption are generally distinct from practices and customs of adoption in other non-Muslim parts of the world like Western or East Asian societies. The adoption in the western sense of the word is not recognized in Islam.

Description
Raising a child who is not one's genetic child is allowed and, in the case of an orphan, even encouraged. But, according to the Islamic view, the child does not become a true child of the "adoptive" parents. For example, the child is named after the biological, not adoptive, father. This does not mean raising a non-biological child is not allowed. It means that the sponsored child doesn't carry the same name as its sponsoring parents. In Islam it is considered a blessing to take care of an orphan, in fact it is considered a duty to some.

A hadith involving Aisha and Abu-Hudhayfah ibn Utbah's adoptive son Salim mawla Abu Hudaifa states:

Abu Hudhaifa, one of those who fought the battle of Badr, with Allah's Apostle adopted Salim as his son and married his niece Hind bint Al-Wahd bin 'Utba to him' and Salim was a freed slave of an Ansari woman. Prophet Muhammad also adopted Zaid as his son and after Zaid divorce his wife, in order to remove any hesitance that adopted people are not biological sons / daughters of their adopters, prophet Muhammad married her. And thus the  prohibition banning fathers marrying their sons’ wives after the wives are divorced does not apply between adoptive parents and their children.

In the Pre-Islamic period the custom was that, if one adopted a son, the people would call him by the name of the adopted-father, till Allah revealed: "Call them (adopted sons) By (the names of) their (biological) fathers" (33.5).

Discussion
There is now some discussion about reconsidering some of the rules about Islamic adoptions. A groundbreaking study was done by the Muslim Women's Shura Council in August 2011 titled, "Adoption and the Care of Orphan Children: Islam and the Best Interests of the Child". This report examined Islamic sources and concluded "adoption can be acceptable under Islamic law and its principal objectives, as long as important ethical guidelines are followed." The study represents a form of independent reasoning (ijtihad) and may raise some awareness and contribute toward shaping a future consensus (ijma) on the issue.

Islamic law scholar Faisal Kutty argues that this report and a number of other developments in the area provide for some optimism that we may be at the cusp of a sea change in this area. Kutty argues that the belief that closed adoption, as practiced in the West, is the only acceptable form of permanent childcare is a significant obstacle to its acceptance among many Muslims. The situation is significantly different when we move to open adoptions, where there is not negation of the biological parentage. Kutty believes that there is sufficient basis in Islamic jurisprudence to argue for qualified support of adoptions and even international adoptions. He writes that it is undeniable that taking care of orphans and foundlings is a religious obligation and that the best interest of children has been a recurrent theme among the various juristic schools. Arguably one of the best ways to take care of these children is to place them in loving homes, provided that a child's lineage is not intentionally negated or concealed. He argues that a reformed model  of Islamic adoptions will enable Muslims to fulfill this religious obligation while ensuring that the most vulnerable do not fall through technical cracks and will not be negatively impacted by formal rules that no longer serve their intended purposes.

See also
 Cultural variations in adoption#Arab
 Kafala system
 Salim ibn Abd-Allah

References

Bibliography 

 Pastena, Adele. Recognition of Kafala in the Italian Law System from a Comparative Perspective. United Kingdom, Cambridge Scholars Publishing, 2020.

External links
 kafala.fr helps orphans, kafala.fr petition
 Special upbringing of special children
 "Kafala" from the Global Legal Information Network Subject Term Index

Adoption and religion
Adoption law
Islam and children
Islamic family law